Navi Mumbai is a planned city situated on the west coast of the Indian subcontinent, located in the Konkan division of Maharashtra state, on the mainland of India. 
Navi Mumbai is part of the Mumbai Metropolitan Region (MMR). The Agri and Koli Communities mainly reside in Navi Mumbai. Navi Mumbai was the host city for the inaugural final of the IPL (2008) at DY Patil Stadium. Thane Belapur Marg and Palm Beach Marg are major business attraction and upmarket residential areas respectively. Navi Mumbai has a population of 1,618,000  as per 2023. It has an average city elevation of 14 meters, excluding forest area.

The city's or area history dates back to the late 1500s when Siddis of Janjira built the Belapur Killa located atop a hillock, near the mouth of the Panvel Creek. In 1682, the fort was captured by the Portuguese, who had managed to annex the regions controlled by the Siddis, near Belapur.

In 1733, the Marathas, led by Chimaji Appa, wrested control of the fort from the Portuguese. He had made a vow that if it were to be successfully recaptured from the Portuguese, he would place a garland of beli leaves in a nearby Amruthaishwar temple, and after the victory the fort was christened as Belapur Fort. The Marathas ruled the area until 23 June 1817, when it was captured by Captain Charles Gray of the British East India Company. The British partially destroyed the fort under their policy of razing any Maratha stronghold in the area.

The area was proposed in 1971 as a new urban township of Mumbai by the Government of Maharashtra. A new public sector undertaking, CIDCO, was established for this purpose. Navi Mumbai is situated across two districts, Thane and Raigad. The city has been ranked 3rd among 73 cities surveyed for cleanliness and hygiene by the Union Ministry of Urban Development (MoUD) and Quality Council of India (QCI) as a part of Swachh Bharat Abhiyan. Majority of Infrastructure and buildings are made & owned by Government of India.

Navi Mumbai is home to various educational institutions offering courses in several streams including engineering, medical sciences, interior design, and hotel management. Various multinational corporations have their head offices/branches across the city, making it an active business hub. Navi Mumbai also has various recreational facilities such as a Golf Course, Central Park and Pandavkada Water Falls in Kharghar. Navi Mumbai also has many quality restaurants and luxury hotels for accommodation. There are many shopping malls. Navi Mumbai is also a host to many best health care centres and hospitals like MITR Hospital in Sector 05, Kharghar, Fortis Hiranandani Hospital near Juhu Village, Juhu Nagar (Vashi), Apollo Hospital in Belapur and SRL diagnostic centres in Kharghar, Panvel, Kamothe, Kalamboli, Kopar Khairane, Juhu Gaon to name a few.

History

India experienced a phenomenal rate of urban growth during the 25 years following independence and Mumbai always has had its due share in it. The population of Greater Mumbai rose from 2.966 million in 1951 to 4.152 million in 1961 and to 5.970 million in 1971, registering 40.0 and 43.80 percent growths during the first and second decades respectively. The rapid rate of growth of population, made possible by the increasing industrial and commercial importance of the city, resulted in a fast deterioration in the quality of life for the majority of people living in the city. Development inputs could not keep pace with the rapidly growing population, industry, trade and commerce. Besides, there are physical limitations to the growth of a city built on a long and narrow peninsula, which has very few connections with the mainland.

The Government of Maharashtra has been alive to the emerging problems of this metropolis. Responsible public opinion was equally vigilant and several constructive suggestions appeared from time to time in the press and elsewhere. All this helped in keeping the problems of Bombay in the forefront of public awareness. In 1958, the Govt. of Bombay appointed a study group under the Chairmanship of Shri S. G. Barve, Secretary to Government, Public Works Department, to consider the problems relating to congestion of traffic, deficiency of open spaces and playfields, shortage of housing and over-concentration of industry in the metropolitan and suburban areas of Bombay, and to recommend specific measures to deal with these.

The Barve Group reported in February 1959. One of its major recommendations was that a rail-cum-road bridge is built across the Thane Creek to connect peninsular Mumbai with the mainland. The group felt that the bridge would accelerate development across the Creek, relieve pressure on the city's railways and roadways, and draw away industrial and residential concentrations eastward to the mainland. The Group hoped that the eastward development would be orderly and would take place in a planned manner.

The Government of Maharashtra accepted the Barve Group recommendation. Another Committee under the Chairmanship of Prof. D. R. Gadgil, then Director of the Gokhale Institute of Politics and Economics, Poona was formed and asked: “to formulate broad principles of regional planning for the metropolitan regions of Mumbai Panvel and Pune and to make recommendations for the establishment of Metropolitan Authorities for preparation and execution of such plans”.

The Gadgil Committee inter-alia made two important recommendations which have influenced the planning for Navi Mumbai. One, a planned decentralisation of industries with severe restrictions on further industrial growth in the Bombay region. Two, development of the mainland area as a multi-nucleated settlement, each settlement smaller in size than 250,000 population. These multi-nucleated settlements are called nodes in the plan, where the entire development is proposed as a series of nodes strung out along the mass transit area. The nodes proposed by us are, however, more closely spaced than the multi-nucleated settlements envisaged by Dr. Gadgil. But the principle remains of individual settlements, self-contained in respect of schools and shopping and other essential services and separated from each other by green spaces.

The Maharashtra Regional and Town Planning Act was passed in 1966 and brought into force in January 1967. The Bombay Metropolitan Region was notified in June 1967 and a Regional Planning Board constituted under the Chairmanship of Shri L. G. Rajwade, I. C. S. The Draft Regional Plan of the Board was finalised in January 1970. It proposed the development of a twin city across the harbour, on the mainland to the east, as a counter-magnet to the office concentration taking place at the southern tip of Bombay. The alternative growth pole was to siphon off the over-concentration of jobs and population which further growth would cause in the city and reallocate these on the mainland. In making this recommendation, the Board was influenced by various factors such as the existing industrial sites in the Thane-Belapur area and Taloja, the imminent completion of the Thane Creek Bridge and the proposal of the Bombay Port Trust to establish a new port at Nhava Sheva.

The Board recommended that the new metro-centre or Navi Mumbai as it is now called, be developed to accommodate a population of 2.1 million.

Implementation, development and issues

The planning of Navi Mumbai began in 1971 and involved leading architects and urban planner like Charles Correa (Chief Architect), Shirish Patel, Pravina Mehta and R. K. Jha (Chief Planner), The City and Industrial Development Corporation (CIDCO) was established on 17 March 1971, under the Indian Companies Act, 1956 for this purpose. The area covered  of the total  of the Konkan coast. Privately owned land consisting of 86 villages covering  within the present limits of Navi Mumbai and further villages measuring an additional  were acquired by the government of Maharashtra. Navi Mumbai covers the southern part of Thane taluka (from Thane District) and part of Panvel and Uran talukas (from Raigad District).

CIDCO carved out 19 small nodes with a view towards facilitating comprehensive development. These nodes were named Airoli, Ghansoli, Kopar Khairane, Juhu Nagar, Vashi, Turbhe, Sanpada, Juinagar, Nerul, Seawoods (Darave), Karave Nagar, CBD Belapur, Kharghar, Kamothe, New Panvel, Kalamboli, Ulwe, Dronagiri and Taloja.

CIDCO planned and constructed all the railway stations, roads and public spaces in Navi Mumbai and developed nearby areas commercially.

In 1973, the Vashi bridge was opened to the public for residents of Vashi, CBD Belapur and Nerul. The Sion-Panvel Highway was built to reduce the time taken to travel from Sion to Panvel. Initially, there was not much response to the new city. Major changes took place only after 1990, with the commissioning of a wholesale agricultural produce market at Turbhe and the construction of a commuter railway line from Mankhurd to Vashi in May 1992. These developments caused a sudden growth in economic activities and population in Navi Mumbai.

The city was originally planned to create affordable housing for people who could not afford living in Mumbai. It was decided not to let any slum pockets pop up across the city. But it failed. as, according to the 2001 census, a fifth to a third of the population of municipalized Navi Mumbai lives in slums
 and gaothans (urban villages), with thousands of buildings violating planning norms.

By the end of the 1990s, the planning authority of Navi Mumbai initiated private participation in the developmental activity of Navi Mumbai. A new railway link between Nerul and Uran was inaugurated on 11 November 2018. Southern Navi Mumbai is being developed rapidly with its class infrastructure and modern nodes of Kharghar, Kamothe, Panvel and Kalamboli. These nodes are experiencing major infrastructural developments due to their proximity to the proposed Navi Mumbai International Airport. Also, the latest development known as 'One Time Planning' with an estimated budget of ₹12,821 crores is underway to transform the municipalized Navi Mumbai on the lines of the Mega Cities of the world.

Administration

CIDCO
When Navi Mumbai was created in the 1970s, CIDCO was the only authority that looked after the development and maintenance of the city. CIDCO prepared a developmental plan for Navi Mumbai covering 95 villages all over the city.

For the first ten years of the project CIDCO acted as the planning and administrative body and as the developer and builder for the project. Taxes on property, land, commercial and water were payable to CIDCO.

CIDCO planned 14 nodes divided into the North and the South part. The 7 nodes in the North part are Airoli node, Ghansoli node, Kopar Khairane node, Vashi node, Sanpada node, Nerul node and Belapur node. The 7 nodes in the South part are Kharghar node, Kamothe node, Kalamboli node, Pushpak Nagar node, Panvel node, Ulwe node and Dronagiri node. Also, two municipal bodies have been established, Navi Mumbai Municipal Corporation (NMMC) in the North and Panvel Municipal Corporation in the South. Each of the nodes is divided into smaller groups called sectors.

Initially only Juhu Nagar, Vashi, Nerul and CBD Belapur were developed by CIDCO with housing, schools and community centre roads. But after the arrival of the harbour railway line extension in the 1990s, there was an increase in population. CIDCO shifted its development plan to nodes like Kharghar, Kamothe, New Panvel and Kopar Khairane. In its new development plan, CIDCO land was allocated to builders for housing. CIDCO only provided basic infrastructure like roads, water and electricity, these nodes were developed mostly by private builders according to the CIDCO plan.

The newly developed nodes of Navi Mumbai on the south side like Kharghar, Kamothe, New Panvel and Kalamboli are maintained by CIDCO. These nodes, which are all beyond CBD Belapur, come under the Raigad district.

NMMC

On 17 December 1991, Navi Mumbai Municipal Corporation (NMMC) was constituted by the state government for maintaining some of the developed nodes of Navi Mumbai.

Local self-government started on 1 January 1992. NMMC was handed seven of the 14 nodes of the Navi Mumbai project area for its jurisdiction. However, CIDCO, as a planning authority, has rights on the open plots in these seven nodes.

The NMMC jurisdiction starts at Digha in the North and ends at Belapur in the South. The NMMC area is planned into seven nodes (zones). The nine nodes are Belapur node, Nerul node, Sanpada Node, Vashi node, Kopar Khairane node, Ghansoli node and Airoli node.

Navi Mumbai Municipal Corporation is rated amongst the richest corporations in Maharashtra.

The municipal corporation is headed by a municipal commissioner and an elected mayor. Currently, due to delayed in corporation election, the commissioner of corporation Mr. Abhijeet Bangar takes the charge of administrator for management of Navi Mumbai Municipal Corporation until next elections.

PMC
Recently a resolution has been passed by the general body of the Panvel Municipal Council (PMC), which previously administered the city of Old Panvel spread across an area of 12.11 sq. km. with a population of 1.8 lakh (0.18 mn), lead to upgrade the Municipal Council to a Municipal Corporation. But the minimum requirement for the formation of a Municipal Corporation is having a population of at least 300,000 which the Council falls short of. Hence, a decision has been made by the PMC to incorporate the adjacent nodes of Navi Mumbai under CIDCO's jurisdiction and surrounding villages in the proposed Panvel Municipal Corporation. This would add another 593,000 people under its administration. thereby clearing the first hurdle.

The decision propounds that instead of merging the administration of newly developed nodes of Navi Mumbai including New Panvel, Kamothe, Kalamboli, Kharghar, parts of Uran and developing nodes of Ulwe and Dronagiri, which are currently overseen by CIDCO, with NMMC, they should be incorporated under the proposed Panvel Municipal Corporation. This opinion is the result of a political agenda. The fact is, of the total 14 nodes of Navi Mumbai 7 are under NMMC and the rest are under CIDCO. NMMC's jurisdiction is limited within the boundaries of the Thane district, which is a foothold of the Nationalist Congress Party, while the remaining nodes are in the Raigad district, where parties like Bharatiya Janata Party, Shiv Sena and Peasants and Workers Party of India are most active. Hence, the local politicians, especially Panvel MLA Prashant Thakur, oppose the merger of all the nodes under one Municipal Corporation citing political conspiracy. In Panvel Municipal Corporation BJP is in power and Peasants and Workers Party of India leading the opposition represent by Pritam Mhatre.

The proposal is to be tabled before the Maharashtra State government which has appointed an expert committee to study the feasibility of the demand to upgrade the Panvel Municipal Council to a Municipal Corporation.

But there is some discontent among the residents of the Kharghar node. The residents and some NGOs from Kharghar have voiced their demand for Kharghar to be inducted under NMMC as it would provide them with better civic amenities and would make Kharghar eligible to be a part of the proposed plan of making Navi Mumbai a Smart City which includes only the area under NMMC's jurisdiction. But, in actual, CIDCO South Navi Mumbai will be MMR's second smart city. The other one being the North Navi Mumbai, which is under NMMC's jurisdiction. State government has asked CIDCO to develop South Navi Mumbai as a smart city as it will be a role model for other states in the country. Smart City project includes, Navi Mumbai International Airport, Mumbai Trans Harbour Link connecting Ulwe with Sewri, a long coastal link from Dronagiri, extension of the Palm Beach Road from Kopar Khairane to Airoli, extension of national highway, local train railway from Panvel to Ulwe and Uran, new metro projects, including CBD Belapur, Taloja, Khandeshwar and Navi Mumbai airport metro project, development of fourth container terminal in JNPT, new greenfield cities, one near Uran, affordable housing schemes for low income groups and Project Affected Peoples (PAPs), new parks, playgrounds, auditoriums, bhavans, noise and air quality index checkers using advanced technologies, modern sewage treatment plants. CIDCO has its own plan of developing the area under its jurisdiction (informally called as Navi Mumbai South) as a smart city. Everything will be completed by 2022, except the airport.

Demographics
As per provisional reports of Census India, population of Navi Mumbai in 2011 is 1,120,547; out of which males and females are 610,060 and 510,487 respectively. Although Navi Mumbai has population of 1,120,547, its urban / metropolitan population is 18,414,288 of which 9,894,088 are males and 8,520,200 are females. At least 65.5% of population speaks Marathi language in Navi Mumbai.

In education section, the total number of literate individuals in Navi Mumbai is 911,542. Out of this number, 519,257 are males while 392,285 are females. Average literacy rate of Navi Mumbai is 91.57 percent of which male and female literacy was 95.05 and 87.33 percent.

The sex ratio of Navi Mumbai is 831 females per 1000 males. Child sex ratio of girls is 901 per 1000 boys.

Transport

Navi Mumbai has a robust infrastructure, is well connected to other parts of the state and country and is relatively less polluted compared to Mumbai. The city has a good public transportation system with NMMT, the transport wing of NMMC, serving the bus commuters, the Mumbai suburban railway serving the train commuters and a large fleet of auto rickshaws for intra-nodal commute. The Mumbai-Pune Expressway starts at Kalamboli in Navi Mumbai.

The Mumbai suburban railway network covers most of the populated regions of the city. The most important suburban stations are Vashi, Nerul, Belapur and Panvel. The stations are planned as major railway junctions. Panvel is the only mainline station and also the busiest railway station of Navi Mumbai. All outstation trains halt here for time periods varying from 5 to 20 minutes. It is an important junction, railway lines come and meet here and it is connected to almost all parts of India. A new broad gauge line is functional between Karjat & Panvel.

Brihanmumbai Electric Supply and Transport (BEST) buses run from various area of Mumbai to Navi Mumbai & Navi Mumbai Municipal Transport (NMMT) buses run all over Navi Mumbai and various area in Mumbai, Thane, Bhiwandi, Kalyan-Dombivli-Badlapur, Panvel-Khopoli-Taloja, Uran-Ulwe etc. NMMT runs AC Volvo buses from Navi Mumbai to Mumbai, Thane and Kalyan-Dombivli.

NMMT Routes in Navi Mumbai

BEST Routes in Navi Mumbai

Auto rickshaws provide inter as well as intra nodal public transport across the city. Taxis operating from designated taxi stands provide the means to travel to further destinations. Taxis charge a fixed rate approved by the R. T. O. details of which can be found on popular local transit apps of the city.

Navi Mumbai has the largest container terminal in India, Jawaharlal Nehru Port at Nhava Sheva near Uran. It is well connected by road and rail, and handles approximately 56.13% of India's container traffic. The Chhatrapati Shivaji Maharaj International Airport, 30 km away, is the nearest airport to the city.

International Airport

The Navi Mumbai International Airport is being constructed in southern Panvel near Ulwe. It is being built through Public Private Partnership (PPP), with private sector partners having 74% equity and the Airports Authority of India (AAI) and Government of Maharashtra (through CIDCO) each holding 13%.

The International Civil Aviation Organization (ICAO) has already given techno-feasibility clearance to the airport. The central government provided cabinet approval for the construction on 31 May 2007. The airport's construction was started in August 2021, and is expected to be fully operational by December 2024.

Metro Rail

The Navi Mumbai Metro is an under construction rapid transit system in Navi Mumbai. A network of as many as six lines have been planned of which four lines will be constructed by CIDCO in the Navi Mumbai south region, the second and third line of the metro system will be constructed by NMMC and MMRDA respectively. The first line of the metro system is being constructed by CIDCO. This line includes three phases. In the first phase, the line will join the CBD Belapur station on the Mumbai suburban railway and Pendhar village. In the second phase, the line will join Taloja MIDC and Khandeshwar node (which will be extended to the[Navi Mumbai International Airport in Ulwe node of the city), and in the third phase, the line will link the Pendhar and Taloja MIDC metro stations. The first phase of the line 1 is slated to become operational by 2020 and CIDCO has claimed to make the network of its four lines fully operational by 2022–2023 along with operationalisation of the city's International Airport in Ulwe node. The cost of the metro project has risen from 4,163 crore for 21.45 km in 2011 to 8,904 crore for 26.26 km in 2018.

Infrastructure
Basic infrastructure worth  is already in place. The city boasts a reliable supply of electricity from various sources, and excellent motoring conditions, with numerous flyovers, broad roads, and parking lots. The main problem which the residents face is poor connectivity with Mumbai, with only two road links between the two cities and a single rail line. A hovercraft service from Vashi to Colaba and the CBD to Colaba did not succeed due to the high cost of tickets and maintenance. CIDCO is planning to relaunch its hovercraft service from Vashi, Belapur, Nerul and Airoli to Gateway of India.

Services
There are adequate utility services, banks, restaurants, malls, multiplexes and other shops in Navi Mumbai. The City boasts several shopping malls such as Little World Mall, Glomax Mall, Prime mall and Pacific Mall in the most developed node of Navi Mumbai, Kharghar; K-Mall and the Orion Mall in Panvel node of the city; Center One, Palm Beach Galleria, Citi Center, Raghuleela Mall and Inorbit Mall in Vashi, along with the Seawoods Nexus Mall in Seawoods. Throughout Navi Mumbai, supermarkets and hypermarkets like Big Bazaar, Reliance Smart, Reliance Smart points, Apna Bazaar, More, Spencer's, Reliance Fresh, Spinach, Daily Bazar and Fairprice cater to the shopping needs of the residents. DMart has launched eight hypermarkets in Navi Mumbai.

Leading banks such as Bank of India, Punjab National Bank, South Indian Bank, State Bank of India, Union Bank, Saraswat Bank, Bank of Baroda, AXIS Bank, Canara Bank, Oriental Bank of Commerce, Central Bank of India, Bank of Maharashtra, State Bank of Hyderabad, Citibank India, ICICI Bank, Jammu & Kashmir Bank, Citi Bank, HSBC Bank and HDFC Bank have their branches and ATMs around Navi Mumbai. The Reserve Bank of India has served the people of Navi Mumbai since 2001.

Cultural centres include the Navi Mumbai Tamil Sangam.

Navi Mumbai has some three-star and five-star hotels; namely Royal Tulip (five-star hotel in Kharghar), The Hotel Three Star (In Kharghar), The Park (Belapur CBD), Fortune Select Exotica-Member ITC Hotel Group (Vashi), The Regenza by Tunga (Vashi), Four Points by Sheraton (Vashi) & Hotel Yogi Executive (Vashi) to name a few.

Commerce

The Navi Mumbai Special Economic Zone (SEZ) located in the nodes of Dronagiri and Kalamboli are planned to provide commercial growth and employment to the city. Positioned en route the proposed Navi Mumbai Airport, this megaproject has attracted investments of close to 40,000 crores. Navi Mumbai is a new hub for newly incorporated companies & start ups to establish their base in Mumbai. As per the list of newly incorporated companies in Navi Mumbai around 500 new & startups companies were registered in and around the region every month.

Sports

Cricket is the most popular sport in the city. Navi Mumbai has its own International Cricket Stadium in Shiravne (Nerul) called the DY Patil Stadium which hosts IPL T-20 matches, including hosting the 2008 and 2010 IPL finals. It is also the home ground for the Indian Super League football club Mumbai City FC. The Fr. Agnel Stadium in Vashi is the training ground of the team.

Navi Mumbai Sports Association is the oldest sports complex in Navi Mumbai, NMSA has contributed significantly to the sports world by creating international level athletes from Navi Mumbai. Navi Mumbai has an Olympic-size swimming pool at Nerul. CIDCO has proposed two 18-hole golf course academies at Nerul and Kharghar. There are plans to have sports facilities in the proposed 80 hectare Central Park being developed in Kharghar. The CIDCO has also constructed an 11-hole golf course in Kharghar near Central Park.

Education

Provision of schools and colleges was priority in the planning of Navi Mumbai. The nodes (townships) were designed to provide one primary school per 5,000 populations, one high school for 12,500 populations and one college for 50,000 population.

Each of the nodes is self-sufficient in terms of providing quality education. Students are given access to various syllabi, including the State Education Board, CBSE, IGCSE, IB and ICSE patterns. Other than this, CIDCO encouraged private institutions as well.

About 22.5% of the total population is considered to be school-going children. Most students attend school and college within their node (township). 76% of the students walk to their school or college, 12% use public transport, 10% use bicycles and only 2% travel by school bus.

A number of premier schools and colleges have been set up in Navi Mumbai. And not just local students, but students from Mumbai and even outside come to Navi Mumbai in their quest for quality education. As such, Navi Mumbai is quickly acquiring the title of educational hub.

Colleges

Amity University
DY Patil University
IIM Indore (Mumbai Campus)
Indian Maritime University, Navi Mumbai Campus
ITM Group of Institutions
National Institute of Fashion Technology
NIFT Mumbai

Engineering Colleges

Fr. Conceicao Rodrigues Institute of Technology, Vashi
Datta Meghe College of Engineering, Airoli
Indian Institution of Industrial Engineering, Belapur
Lokmanya Tilak College of Engineering, Koparkhairane
Ramrao Adik Institute of Technology, Nerul
SIES Graduate School of Technology, Nerul
Terna Engineering College, Nerul

Schools

Fr. Agnel Multipurpose School and Junior College, Vashi
Avalon Heights International School
Bharati Vidyapeeth Institute of Technology
D. A. V. Public School, Nerul
Dayanand Anglo Vedic Public School, Airoli
Delhi Public School, Nerul
Goldcrest High International School
New Horizon Scholars School, Airoli
Ryan International Schools, Sanpada, Kharghar, Vashi, Kalamboli 
Seventh-Day Adventist Higher Secondary School (ICSE & ISC)
Sacred Heart High School, Vashi
VIBGYOR Group of Schools, Airoli
VIBGYOR Group of Schools, Kharghar
Vishwajyot High School, Kharghar

See also
Dnyanvani

References

External links

 
Navi Mumbai Municipal Corporation Accessed 11 October 2012.
Navi Mumbai Special Economic Zone 
CIDCO – City and Industrial Development Corporation Accessed 29 June 2013.
 navi Mumbai metro train trial
Navi Mumbai RTO Code

 
1970s establishments in Maharashtra
Mumbai
Smart cities in India
Planned cities in India
Port cities in India
Cities in Maharashtra